Kylemore College is a secondary school in Ballyfermot, Dublin, Ireland. It is a gender mixed school and is a CDETB school. It also offers PLC courses.

Kylemore College was established in 1965 by the City of Dublin Vocational Education Committee (CDVEC) as a vocational school. Over the years Kylemore College has changed and developed into a co-educational college.

References

External links

Secondary schools in Dublin (city)